Regional School Unit 71 (RSU 71), formerly Maine School Administrative District 71 (MSAD 71 or SAD 71) is a school district containing the towns of Kennebunk, Maine and Kennebunkport, Maine.  It currently (as of July 2005) provides 5 schools for the children within its boundaries:

 Kennebunk Elementary School — a new school building, replacing the older Cousins School and Park Street School.  It provides classes for kindergarten through grade 3 for children from Kennebunk.
 Sea Road School — located in the lower village of Kennebunk, it provides classes for grade 4 and grade 5 for children from Kennebunk.
 Consolidated School — provides classes for kindergarten through grade 5 for children from Kennebunkport.
 Middle School of the Kennebunks — provides classes for grade 6 through grade 8 for all children in the district.
 Kennebunk High School — provides classes for grade 9 through grade 12 for all children in the district.  It is also attended by many students from nearby Arundel, which has no high school.

External links

Official District Website, 2005 archive
Official District Blog, 2007 archive

71
Education in York County, Maine